Golujeh or Gollujeh or Galoojeh or Galujeh may refer to:
 Golujeh, Khalkhal, Ardabil Province
 Golujeh, Khvoresh Rostam, Ardabil Province
 Golujeh, Nir, Ardabil Province
 Gollujeh, Ahar, East Azerbaijan Province
 Golujeh, Bostanabad, East Azerbaijan Province
 Golujeh, Meyaneh, East Azerbaijan Province
 Gollujeh, Sarab, East Azerbaijan Province
 Golujeh, Tabriz, East Azerbaijan Province
 Golujeh-ye Eslam, East Azerbaijan Province
 Golujeh-ye Ghami, East Azerbaijan Province
 Golujeh-ye Hasan Beyg, East Azerbaijan Province
 Golujeh-ye Khaleseh, East Azerbaijan Province
 Golujeh-ye Mohammad Khan, East Azerbaijan Province
 Golujeh-ye Olya, East Azerbaijan Province
 Golujeh-ye Said, East Azerbaijan Province
 Golujeh, Zanjan